ERG4 or Delta(24(24(1)))-sterol reductase or Delta(24(28))-sterol reductase is an enzyme that catalyzes the last step of ergosterol biosynthesis pathway in fungi Saccharomyces cerevisiae (Baker's yeast), which 5,7,22,24(28)-ergostatetraenol converted into ergosterol.

References 

EC 1.3.1
Saccharomyces cerevisiae genes